Hal Reid (born James Halleck Reid; April 14, 1863 – May 22, 1920) was an American playwright and stage and screen actor.

Biography
Born in 1863, Reid entered the film business in 1910 as an actor, director, and writer, bringing along his teen son Wallace Reid, who had aspirations to be a director or cameraman. Many of his plays saw Broadway openings. In 1912, Reid was appointed Censor to the Universal Film Corporation.

Reid was at one time said to be actually Harry Preston and that he had served a prison sentence for an unspecified crime.

His parents were Hugh McMillan Reid and America Elizabeth Reid.  Hal was married three times with each woman bearing him a child. His first wife was Marylee Withers, m. 1879, who at 16 produced a daughter, Hazel Withers Reid in 1882. Hazel died in 1921 a year after her father. Wife two was Bertha Westbrook, m. 1889, who produced son Wallace in 1891. Wife three was the much younger Marcella, m. 1916, who also produced a son, James Hillock Reid.

His son Wallace Reid became an actor who starred in many films of Hollywood's silent era.

Selected plays

At Cripple Creek
A Mother's Love
A Child Wife
Custer's Last Fight (1905)
For Love of a Woman
Human Hearts (original title Logan's Luck, 1895)
In Convict Stripes
Knobs o'Tennessee (1899)
A Working Girl's Wrong
A Wife for a Day
A Wife's Secret(1903)
For a Human Life (1906)
A Millionaire's Revenge(1906)
The Prince of the World
The Avenger (1907)
The Gipsy Girl(1905)
The Shoemaker (1907)
Sweet Molly O! (1907)
The Cow Puncher (1906)
Roanoak
The Peddler (1902)
The German Immigrants
The Heart of Virginia
The Singing Girl from Killarney (1907)
The Pride of Newspaper Row
From Broadway to Bowery (1907)

Filmography
as actor only

The Girl from Arizona (1910) short
Becket (1910) short
Human Hearts (1910) short
Wig Wag (1911) short
One Touch of Nature (1911) short
The Path of True Love (1912) short
Jean Intervenes (1912) short
Indian Romeo and Juliet (1912) short
The Hobo's Redemption (1912) short
Cardinal Wolsey (1912) short
Father Beauclaire (1912) short
Virginius (1912) short
A Nation's Peril (1912) short
Rip Van Winkle (1912) short
Every Inch a Man (1912) short
The Deerslayer (1913) short
Dan (1914)
Time Lock No. 776 (1915)
Mothers of Men (1917)
Little Miss Hoover (1918)
The Two Brides (1919)

References

External links

James Halleck Reid; North American Theatre Online
trade advert. announcing Reid working as a director for Reliance Pictures

1863 births
1920 deaths
Male actors from Ohio
19th-century American male actors
20th-century American male actors
American male stage actors
American male film actors
19th-century American dramatists and playwrights
20th-century American dramatists and playwrights
People from Cedarville, Ohio
Writers from Ohio
American male dramatists and playwrights
19th-century American male writers
20th-century American male writers
Film directors from Ohio